Winston County is a county located in the U.S. state of Mississippi. In the 2020 census, the population was 17,714. Its county seat is Louisville. The county is named for Louis Winston (1784–1824), a colonel in the militia, a prominent lawyer, and a judge of the Mississippi Supreme Court.

The county is the site of Nanih Waiya, an ancient mound built in the Woodland period, about 1 CE-300 CE. Since the 17th century, it has been venerated by the Choctaw people who later occupied the area. As of 2008, the mound is owned by the Mississippi Band of Choctaw Indians, a federally-recognized tribe.

History
The county is one of sixteen formed when chief Greenwood LeFlore ceded the lands in the Treaty of Dancing Rabbit Creek, which resulted in the removal of the Choctaw Nation from their ancestral lands to Oklahoma.

In 1863, during the American Civil War, the Union Army under Colonel Benjamin H. Grierson, marched through Louisville with 900 troops on a raid through Mississippi. There was no fighting in Winston County and no significant destruction of property.

Geography

Major highways
  Mississippi Highway 14
  Mississippi Highway 15
  Mississippi Highway 19
  Mississippi Highway 25

Adjacent counties
 Oktibbeha County (north)
 Noxubee County (east)
 Kemper County (southeast)
 Neshoba County (south)
 Attala County (west)
 Choctaw County (northwest)

National protected area
 Tombigbee National Forest (part)

Demographics

2020 census

As of the 2020 United States Census, there were 17,714 people, 7,269 households, and 4,737 families residing in the county.

2010 census
As of the 2010 United States Census, there were 19,198 people living in the county. 51.9% were White, 45.6% Black or African American, 1.1% Native American, 0.2% Asian, 0.2% of some other race and 0.9% of two or more races. 1.0% were Hispanic or Latino (of any race).

2000 census
At the 2000 census, there were 20,160 people, 7,578 households and 5,471 families living in the county. The population density was 33 per square mile (13/km2). There were 8,472 housing units at an average density of 14 per square mile (5/km2). The racial makeup of the county was 55.26% White, 43.25% Black or African American, 0.66% Native American, 0.08% Asian, 0.28% from other races, and 0.46% from two or more races.  1.21% of the population were Hispanic or Latino of any race.

There were 7,578 households, of which 33.50% had children under the age of 18 living with them, 49.90% were married couples living together, 18.10% had a female householder with no husband present, and 27.80% were non-families. 25.20% of all households were made up of individuals, and 12.50% had someone living alone who was 65 years of age or older.  The average household size was 2.59 and the average family size was 3.09.

26.80% of the population were under the age of 18, 9.20% from 18 to 24, 26.10% from 25 to 44, 22.50% from 45 to 64, and 15.50% who were 65 years of age or older. The median age was 36 years. For every 100 females there were 93.70 males. For every 100 females age 18 and over, there were 88.30 males.

The median household income was $28,256, and the median family income was $33,602. Males had a median income of $28,665 versus $18,210 for females. The per capita income for the county was $14,548. About 19.40% of families and 23.70% of the population were below the poverty line, including 32.90% of those under age 18 and 18.90% of those age 65 or over.

Communities

City
 Louisville (county seat)

Town
 Noxapater

Unincorporated communities
 Highpoint
 Vernon

Ghost towns
 Perkinsville
 Randalls Bluff
 Singleton

Education
There are three public high schools in Winston County, Louisville High School (Louisville Wildcats) , Nanih Waiya Attendance Center (Nanih Waiya Warriors) and Noxapater Attendance Center (Noxapater Tigers). In addition, there are two private schools, Winston Academy also known as (W.A.) or (Winston Patriots), established in 1969 as a segregation academy, and Grace Christian School (Eagles) in Louisville which was founded in 1970.

Politics

Notable people
Andy Kennedy  - basketball player and coach

See also
 National Register of Historic Places listings in Winston County, Mississippi

References

 
Mississippi counties
Counties of Appalachia
1833 establishments in Mississippi
Populated places established in 1833
Majority-minority counties in Mississippi